The 1920–21 season was Real Madrid Club de Fútbol's 19th season in existence. The club played some friendly matches. They also played in the Campeonato Regional Centro (Central Regional Championship).

Summary
King Alfonso XIII granted Madrid Football Club the title "Real" (Spanish for "royal") on 29 June 1920. The High Steward of the monarch sent a letter to club president Pedro Parages stating, "His Majesty the King, has served to grant with the greatest satisfaction the Title of Royal, to this Football Club of which you are worthy President, which, from now on, will be able to prevail over your name. I hereby inform you of the above and of the consequences thereof." The royal patronage permitted the club to add the royal crown to its crest and subsequently Madrid Football Club was renamed Real Madrid Football Club.

Friendlies

Competitions

Overview

Campeonato Regional Centro

League table

Matches

Notes

References

Real Madrid
Real Madrid CF seasons